Motu One (Marquesan for "Sand Island") is the name of a small sandbank with no vegetation, located on the western edge of a coral reef; the only atoll in the Marquesas Islands.

It is a calcareous coral reef on a volcanic plug - the only island in the group not made of exposed volcanic material.

Motu One is administratively part of the commune (municipality) of Nuku-Hiva, itself in the administrative subdivision of the Marquesas.

Although Motu One was reportedly visited by Marquesans, primarily on egg-collecting missions, there is no archaeological evidence that it was ever inhabited. The first Westerners to sight the islet were those on the 1813–1814 voyage of the American commander Commodore David Porter, who named it Lincoln Island. Subsequent explorers called it Sand Island.

Ecology
Green sea turtles nest on Motu One. There is a large stand of Porolithon (Hydrolithon) that is unique in French Polynesia.

There are a wide variety of pelagic birds nesting on the islets including a subspecies of the southern Marquesan reed warbler, the Mohotani Marquesan warbler (Acrocephalus mendanae consobrina) (Murphy & Mathews, 1928).

Since 1992, the whole reef and island ecosystem have been protected as the Motu One Reserve.

See also

 Marquesan Nature Reserves
 Desert island
 List of islands

References

External links 
Société d'Ornithologie de Polynésie "MANU"

Islands of the Marquesas Islands
Uninhabited islands of French Polynesia